Marins is a surname of Portuguese origin, meaning Marias's son. People with this surname include:

Alysson Marendaz Marins (born 1976), Brazilian footballer
Carla Marins (born 1968), Brazilian actress
Celismar dos Santos Marins (born 1986), Brazilian footballer
Francisco Marins (1922–2016), Brazilian writer
José Mojica Marins (born 1936), Brazilian filmmaker
Vagner Luís de Oliveira Marins (born 1980), Brazilian footballer

See also 
 Marin (disambiguation)

Portuguese-language surnames
Matronymic surnames